Björnlunda is a locality situated in Gnesta Municipality, Södermanland County, Sweden with 827 inhabitants in 2010. Björnlunda is located between the city of Södertälje and the city of Katrineholm and close to halfway between Strängnäs and Nyköping in a north-south direction.

History 
The earliest citation for Björnlunda is in a document dating from around 1314 in which the settlement is called "Biornlundum". However, there are traces of Viking-era settlement and there are Iron Age graves in the area.

For a long time the nearby village of Önnersta was the main settlement in the area, as it lay on the route used by Swedish monarchs travelling between Gripsholm Castle and Nyköpingshus.
However, the establishment of a railway line between Stockholm and Gothenburg in 1862 led to a gradual drift of markets and population to the area nearest the new railway station in Björnlunda, which became the dominant settlement in the area.

Riksdag elections

Attractions 
Jägerdals Gård, Haversjön, The local museum, Dagnäsön, Björnlunda Church, Öster Malma, Laxne, Krampan, Skottvångs gruva, Näsberget, Jätkyrkan, Kyrksjön, Kleva kvarn.

References 

Populated places in Södermanland County
Populated places in Gnesta Municipality